Qato is a surname. Notable people with the surname include:

Klinti Qato (born 1999), Albanian footballer
Kreshnik Qato (born 1978), Albanian boxer
Sonila Qato (born 1977), Albanian politician and lawyer

See also
Cato (disambiguation)